23rd London Film Critics Circle Awards
12 February 2003

Film of the Year: 
 About Schmidt 

British Film of the Year: 
 All or Nothing 

The 23rd London Film Critics Circle Awards, honouring the best in film for 2002, were announced by the London Film Critics Circle on 12 February 2003.

Winners and nominees

Film of the Year
 About Schmidt 
Bowling for Columbine
Donnie Darko
Lantana
Road to Perdition

British Film of the Year
 All or Nothing 
About a Boy
Sweet Sixteen

Foreign Language Film of the Year
 Y Tu Mamá También • Mexico
The Son's Room • Italy
Talk to Her • Spain

Director of the Year
 Phillip Noyce - The Quiet American 
Pedro Almodóvar - Talk to Her
Peter Jackson - The Lord of the Rings: The Two Towers

British Director of the Year
Christopher Nolan - Insomnia 
Mike Leigh - All or Nothing
Sam Mendes - Road to Perdition

Screenwriter of the Year
Andrew Bovell - Lantana 
Nia Vardalos - My Big Fat Greek Wedding
David Self - Road to Perdition

British Screenwriter of the Year
Steven Knight - Dirty Pretty Things 
Mike Leigh - All or Nothing
Paul Laverty - Sweet Sixteen

Actor of the Year
Michael Caine - The Quiet American 
Jack Nicholson - About Schmidt
Al Pacino - Insomnia

Actress of the Year
Stockard Channing - The Business of Strangers 
Kerry Armstrong - Lantana
Halle Berry - Monster's Ball

British Actor of the Year
Hugh Grant - About a Boy 
Chiwetel Ejiofor - Dirty Pretty Things
Ralph Fiennes - Spider

British Actress of the Year
Lesley Manville - All or Nothing 
Samantha Morton - Morvern Callar
Miranda Richardson - Spider

British Supporting Actor of the Year
Kenneth Branagh - Harry Potter and the Chamber of Secrets 
Paul Bettany - A Beautiful Mind
Jude Law - Road to Perdition

British Supporting Actress of the Year
Emily Watson - Red Dragon 
Shirley Henderson - 24 Hour Party People
Ruth Sheen - All or Nothing

British Newcomer of the Year
Martin Compston - Sweet Sixteen  
Keira Knightley - Bend It Like Beckham 
Asif Kapadia - The Warrior

Dilys Powell Award
Lewis Gilbert

External links
IMDB
Official Website

References

2
2002 film awards
2002 in London
2002 in British cinema